Manuel Velasco Suárez (San Cristóbal de las Casas 28 December 1914 – Ciudad de México 2 December 2001) was a Mexican neurologist, neurosurgeon, scientist and humanist. He became governor of the state of Chiapas.

Career 
Velasco founded and was the first director of  National Institute of Neurology and Neurosurgery (INNN) that today bears his name and of which he was its first director.  In 1977, he was appointed director emeritus and honorary member of the Governing Board of the Institute until his death in December 2001.

He created the chair of neurology and neurosurgery at the Faculty of Medicine of the National Autonomous University of Mexico (UNAM) and in 1989 that university named him Emeritus Professor and distinguished him with the Academic Merit Medal for having taught classes for more than 60 years.

He participated in the founding of the National Bioethics Commission in 1992 and the Mexican National Academy of Bioethics.

He promoted the closure of inhumane asylums, introduced neuropsychiatry, and in 1948 promoted services for mentally ill patients of the brain and nervous system at the Hospital Juárez de México (then known as Hospital de San Pablo) and later in the creation of seven regional hospitals.

He was a scientist, humanist, pacifist and creator of institutions. As a humanist, he participated in the struggles against the proliferation of nuclear and chemical weapons and within these efforts he was the Hispanic American leader of the International Physicians for the Prevention of Nuclear War, an association that in 1985 received the Nobel Peace Prize.

He led neurology, mental health and rehabilitation of the Mexican Ministry of Health and Public Assistance in 1958.

He became a politician affiliated with the Institutional Revolutionary Party and acted as Governor of Chiapas from 1970 to 1976.

His grandson Manuel Velasco Coello also became Governor of Chiapas.

References

1914 births
2001 deaths
Politicians from Chiapas
Governors of Chiapas
Institutional Revolutionary Party politicians
Academic staff of the National Autonomous University of Mexico
20th-century Mexican politicians
People from San Cristóbal de las Casas
Mexican neuroscientists
Pacifists
Mexican humanitarians